Peter Johnson (1857–1943) was a fireman first class serving in the United States Navy during the Spanish–American War who received the Medal of Honor for bravery.

Biography
Johnson was born December 29, 1857, in Sumerland, England. He married Anna Louise NN  from England (1888–1958).

Medal of Honor citation
Rank and organization: Fireman First Class, U.S. Navy. Born: 29 December 1857, Sumerland, England. Accredited to: Pennsylvania. G.O. No.: 167, 27 August 1904.

Citation:

On board the U.S.S. Vixen on the night of 28 May 1898. Following the explosion of the lower front manhole gasket of boiler A of the vessel, Johnson displayed great coolness and self-possession in entering the fireroom.

See also

List of Medal of Honor recipients for the Spanish–American War

References

External links

1857 births
1943 deaths
United States Navy Medal of Honor recipients
United States Navy sailors
American military personnel of the Spanish–American War
English-born Medal of Honor recipients
English emigrants to the United States
Spanish–American War recipients of the Medal of Honor